BCL may stand for:

Law & Politics
 Bachelor of Civil Law, the term used to describe a variety of legal degrees offered by universities in English-speaking countries (as distinct from Canon Law and Common Law)
 Bangladesh Chhatra League, the student wing of Bangladesh Awami League
 British Common Law, the legal system, developed in England after the Norman Conquest in 1066, used by approximately one third of the global population.

Logic
 Binary combinatory logic

People
 Bunga Citra Lestari, Indonesian actress and singer

Science
 Members of the Bcl-2 family, a group of related proteins involved in apoptosis, particularly bcl-2

Sports
 Baltimore Catholic League
 Bangladesh Championship League, 2nd tier of Bangladesh football league system
 Bangladesh Cricket League, an annual four-team first-class cricket competition in Bangladesh
 Either one of two leagues that form the Bay Area Conference, part of the North Coast Section of the California Interscholastic Federation
 Bay Counties League – West (BCL West) which has 16 schools
 Bay Counties League – East (BCL East) which has 10 schools
 Baseball Challenge League
 Basketball Champions League
 Boston City League, a high school athletic conference in Massachusetts, United States
 Box Cricket League, an Indian sports league

Technology
 Base Class Library, a computer programming standard library which forms a fundamental part of the Standard Libraries of the Common Language Infrastructure

Transport
 Barra del Colorado Airport in Barra del Colorado, Costa Rica
 Bencoolen MRT station in Singapore (MRT station abbreviation)

Other uses
 the ISO 639-3 code for the Central Bikol language
 Bass clarinet
 Birmingham Central Library
 British Cellophane Limited
 Broadcast Communications Limited (New Zealand), now Kordia
 BCL Limited, formerly Bamangwato Concessions Limited, a mining company in Botswana
 "B.C.L. RED", a designation of the fictional superhero Soldier Boy in the television series The Boys